The 2016 Stanford Cardinal men's soccer team represented Stanford University during the 2016 NCAA Division I men's soccer season. It was the 43rd season of the university fielding a program.

The Cardinal entered the season as the defending national champions. The Cardinal successfully defended their title in the 2016 NCAA Tournament against the Wake Forest Demon Deacons.

Roster 
As of December 5, 2016

Coaching staff 

{|class="wikitable"
|-
! Position !! Person
|-

Schedule 

|-
!colspan=6 style="background:#8C1515; color:#FFFFFF;"| Preseason
|-

|-
!colspan=6 style="background:#8C1515; color:#FFFFFF;"| Non-conference regular season
|-

|-
!colspan=6 style="background:#8C1515; color:#FFFFFF;"| Pac-12 Conference regular season
|-

|-
!colspan=6 style="background:#8C1515; color:#FFFFFF;"| NCAA Tournament
|-

|-

References

External links 
 Men's Soccer Schedule

Stanford Cardinal
Stanford Cardinal men's soccer seasons
Stanford Cardinal, Soccer
Stanford Cardinal
NCAA Division I Men's Soccer Tournament-winning seasons
Stanford
NCAA Division I Men's Soccer Tournament College Cup seasons